Hesitation Marks is the eighth studio album by American industrial rock band Nine Inch Nails, released on August 30, 2013, by The Null Corporation and distributed by Columbia Records in the United States and Polydor Records elsewhere. It was the band's first release in five years, following The Slip (2008), as well as their only release on Columbia. Like previous albums, the album was produced by frontman Trent Reznor alongside longtime collaborators Atticus Ross and Alan Moulder.

The album's title is derived from the term "hesitation marks", which is used to describe marks that are produced by testing a bladed weapon before attempting suicide or self-harming. The cover art also varies for each edition of the album. The record was promoted with three singles: "Came Back Haunted", "Copy of a", and "Everything", as well as the Twenty Thirteen Tour and two accompanying extended plays, Live 2013 EP and Remix 2014 EP. The digital version of the album was made available in two different masters: a standard version and one with extended dynamic range to cater to audiophiles.

Hesitation Marks received positive reviews from critics, with the new sound attracting praise, which some found to be a natural evolution from their previous work. The album reached number three in the US, their highest-charting album since Year Zero, and was nominated for a Grammy Award for Best Alternative Music Album at the 56th Annual Grammy Awards.

Background
In February 2009, Trent Reznor stated, "I've been thinking for some time now it's time to make NIN disappear for a while", indicating the possible end of the act. Nine Inch Nails then entered a hiatus after touring with Jane's Addiction and performing on a few subsequent shows. Afterwards, Reznor clarified that the band was done with touring for the foreseeable future, but that he would continue to make music under the moniker.

Since then, Reznor pursued other projects. In 2010, he formed the post-industrial project, How to Destroy Angels with long-time collaborator Atticus Ross and West Indian Girl frontwoman Mariqueen Maandig, whom he married in 2009. In 2010, Reznor also collaborated with Atticus Ross on the original score for David Fincher's 2010 film, The Social Network. The duo won a 2010 Golden Globe Award for Best Original Score for a Motion Picture and a 2010 Academy Award for Best Original Score. Reznor and Ross again collaborated with Fincher for the official score the American adaptation of the novel The Girl with the Dragon Tattoo, released in December 2011.

In an interview with BBC Radio 1, Reznor indicated that he would be writing for the majority of 2012 with Nine Inch Nails "in mind". In 2012, Reznor confirmed that he was working on new Nine Inch Nails material and would possibly be performing live again. In February 2013, Reznor announced the return of Nine Inch Nails and revealed tour details. The album was first acknowledged by Trent Reznor on May 28, 2013, in a post on nin.com:

The album began life as a couple of tracks that were meant to be included in a forthcoming greatest hits package for Interscope Records. The sessions gave way to more songs and ended up yielding an entire album. The two songs originally written and recorded for the hits package were revealed to be "Everything" and "Satellite".

Release and promotion
On August 12, 2013, Amazon UK officially made the album's second track "Copy of a" available for free to download. On August 22, 2013, a radio rip of "Find My Way" was uploaded to YouTube. On August 27, 2013, the album was streamed on iTunes after it was leaked online. The album was made available in two different masters for digital download; a "standard" version and an "audiophile mastered" version, the latter of which having extended dynamic range not meant to be competitive in the loudness war.

Packaging
Each version of the album has its own cover with artwork by Russell Mills whose art was previously used 19 years earlier on The Downward Spiral, its accompanying singles, and the double VHS set Closure.

About the cover arts, Mills said:

Mills also explained that the works explore ideas of "catharsis, of being into dissolution into being, both on a personal and sociological level." Mills said that the works allude to ideas about chaos and order. He also described the artworks as a "cross between the forensic and a pathology of the personal in which only fragments remain, in which minimal clues can suggest events that may have occurred."

During the creation of the cover arts, Mills used traditional materials such as oils, acrylic paints, varnishes and wires as well as miscellaneous objects which were subject to various chemical processes, including burning, bleaching, calcification and erosion. Blood was used for standard CD cover and digital cover.

Tour

In February 2013, Reznor announced a tour in support of the album, it began in Summer 2013 and concluded in 2014. The initial line-up was Reznor, Eric Avery, Adrian Belew, Alessandro Cortini, Josh Eustis and Ilan Rubin but Avery and Belew would later leave before the tour began meanwhile Robin Finck was added to the line-up. The band's first show was in July at Fuji Rock Festival in Japan. A North American arena leg dubbed "Tension" ran from September until November, the leg added Pino Palladino, Lisa Fischer and Sharlotte Gibson to the line-up. Nine Inch Nails continued the tour as a 4-piece band in 2014 with Renzor, Rubin, Cortini and Finck in the lineup.

Reception

Critical reception for the album has been generally positive. At Metacritic, which assigns a rating out of 100 to reviews from mainstream critics, the album has an average of 77, based on 40 reviews, indicating "generally favorable reviews". AllMusic critic and senior editor Stephen Thomas Erlewine stated: "Hesitation Marks makes it quite clear that Trent Reznor is no longer an angry young man but rather a restless, inventive artist who is at peace with himself, and the result is a record that provides real, lasting nourishment." 

Jason Pettigrew of Alternative Press described the album as "both business as usual and remarkably prescient."  Dave Simpson of The Guardian wrote: "Hesitation Marks is a very different beast to an intense industrial classic such as 1994's The Downward Spiral, but the darkness remains in lyrics that address self-doubt and the struggle for identity with honesty and candour." Writing for Kerrang!, George Garner inferred that "Hesitation Marks would provide Nine Inch Nails with a future every bit as promising as their illustrious past." NME critic Louis Pattison stated: "This is the sound of a cleaner, smoother Nine Inch Nails, one that delights in complexities of rhythm more than caustic blasts of rage." 

Stuart Berman of Pitchfork wrote that the album is "much more in tune with the spartan grooves of the xx and the elastic electro of the Knife than his [Reznor's] usual arena-rattling influences." David Fricke of Rolling Stone described the album as "one of Reznor's best", stating that "it combines the textural exploration on the 1999 double CD The Fragile, and the tighter fury of his 1994 master blast, The Downward Spiral." Christopher R. Weingarten of Spin regarded the album as "the most important artistic statement from NIN leader Trent Reznor since the late '90s." Nevertheless, Philip Cosores was mixed in his assessment of the album and thought: "For the album itself, the good ideas seem to have been wasted on trying to revive something that killed itself years ago."

"I was expecting Trent to come back angrier than ever," remarked Gary Numan. "He did something more unexpected than that. He comes back with something which doesn't seem that angry at all. Sonically, it's phenomenal. The quality of the sound and the recording are just absolutely amazing – so beautifully done… That's really brave: to come back with all those expectations and do something different, and make it work."

The audiophile mastered version of the album has been the subject of discussion on several audio-related websites which claim that its "audiophile" credentials are debatable since its dynamic range is not much higher than the standard version due to audio compression.

Accolades
Hesitation Marks was nominated for Best Alternative Music Album at the 2014 Grammy Awards. Rolling Stone, Stereogum, and Spin included it in their best albums of 2013 lists.

Commercial performance
Hesitation Marks debuted at number three on the Billboard 200 with 107,000 copies sold in its first week, Nine Inch Nails' fifth top five album. As of December 2013, the album had sold 187,000 copies. In Canada, the album debuted atop the Canadian Albums Chart with first-week sales of 12,000 copies, becoming the band's first number-one album on the chart. The album was certified Gold in Canada on September 26, 2013. The album sold 12,286 copies to enter the UK Albums Chart at number two, earning the band its highest-charting album yet in the United Kingdom.

Track listing
The full track listing was announced on June 21, 2013, along with the credits. The deluxe edition features three additional remixes and an interview with Trent Reznor. The interview also includes three untitled demo songs from the album sessions, along with a demo sample of the song "All Time Low":

All songs written by Trent Reznor, except "The Eater of Dreams" by Trent Reznor and Alessandro Cortini. "While I'm Still Here" contains a lyrical interpolation from "Weary Blues from Waitin written and performed by Hank Williams.

Personnel
 Trent Reznor – vocals, electronics, guitar , percussion , bass , wurlitzer , dulcitone , wheelharp , piano , saxophone , production

Additional musicians
 Alessandro Cortini – electronics 
 Pino Palladino – bass 
 Ilan Rubin – toms , live drums 
 Lindsey Buckingham – guitars 
 Adrian Belew – guitars , electronics , backing vocals 
 Eugene Goreshter – strings , electronics , violin , bass 
 Daniel Rowland – electronics, guitar, additional sound design 
 Joshua Eustis – backing vocals

Technical
 Atticus Ross – production, engineering
 Alan Moulder – production, mixing, engineering
 Tom Baker – mastering
 Russell Mills – artwork
 Rob Sheridan – art direction
 Jun Murakawa – engineering
 Dustin Mosley – engineering
 Ghian Wright – engineering
 Michael Patterson – engineering, mixing 
 Joe Barresi – drum recording
 Mike Fasano – drum technician

Charts

Weekly charts

Year-end charts

Certifications

Release history

References

2013 albums
Albums produced by Alan Moulder
Albums produced by Atticus Ross
Albums produced by Trent Reznor
Columbia Records albums
Nine Inch Nails albums
The Null Corporation albums
Polydor Records albums
Albums with cover art by Russell Mills (artist)